The Centurion ARV Mk II,  was a British  armoured recovery vehicle based on the Centurion main battle tank.

History
The Centurion Mk II ARV consisted of a basic tank hull with a box-like superstructure in place of the turret. This accommodated the winch and a separate winch engine, a 160 hp Rolls-Royce B80. The winch engine powered a generator providing electric power to the winch. The cable emerged from the back of the winch housing and a rear mounted spade gave stability whilst winching. The vehicle was used by Australia, India, Israel, the Netherlands, Sweden, Switzerland as well as the United Kingdom.

The first prototype of the Centurion Mk II ARV was developed by the Fighting Vehicles Research and Development Establishment as the ARV FV 4006 and completed in 1952–53. After user trials, the first production vehicles were completed by Vickers at Elswick in 1956–57.
Some Mk 2's used the hulls of former gun tanks or tugs but most were newly built as ARVs.

From 1956 to 1960, the Swiss army bought 30 Entpannungspanzer 56 Centurion. These were used until 1991 with the numbers M + 78601 to M + 78630. In 1988 the first ten vehicles were scrapped. In 1991, 19 vehicles were sold to Sweden and a vehicle (M + 78613) was retained for the army's collection. The Entpannungspanzer 56 Centurion sold to Sweden were painted with the camouflage of the Swedish army and were equipped with minor modifications to the radio, fog dispensers, lighting, etc. In 2011, the second vehicle of the first series with the former number M + 78602 was taken back from Sweden and has since been exhibited in the Swiss Military Museum Full.

In addition to the main engine, a Rover Meteor mark IVB1 (V12, 27-litre capacity, 650 hp), the Entpannungspanzer 56 Centurion has an auxiliary engine (Morris USHNM A41 Mk 2/1: 4 cylinders, 918 cm³, 16 hp) and a winch motor (Rolls-Royce B80 Mk. 2:  8 cylinder in line 5600 cm³, 136 hp).

References

 Urs Heller: Die Panzer der Schweizer Armee von 1920 bis 2008.
 Reglement 65.708 Entpannungspanzer 1956 (Entp Pz 56), Betrieb und Einsatz
 Schweizerisches Militärmuseum Full
 http://www.armyvehicles.dk/centurionarv.htm

External links
 auf militaerfahrzeuge.ch

Military vehicles of the United Kingdom
Leyland Motors
Tanks of Switzerland
Tracked armoured recovery vehicles